Black Panther is an American motion comic and television series by Marvel Knights Animation, based on the Marvel Comics superhero of the same name. It was the first animated television series produced by BET since Hey Monie!. Each of the six episodes of the series was 20 minutes in length.

The series was broadcast on the Australian children's channel ABC Me in January 2010 and in the United States on BET in November 2011.

Plot
Upon becoming the new Black Panther after the assassination of his father T'Chaka, T'Challa deals with the jealousy in the Wakandan royal court while looking for the man who killed his father. Unbeknownst to Black Panther, Klaw (the man who assassinated T'Chaka) has assembled a group of villains consisting of Batroc the Leaper, Juggernaut, the Vatican Black Knight, and the Russian Radioactive Man to help him take over Wakanda.

Cast
 Djimon Hounsou as T'Challa / Black Panther
 Stan Lee as General Wallace
 Kerry Washington as Princess Shuri
 Alfre Woodard as Dondi Reese, Queen Mother, Dora Milaje
 Carl Lumbly as Uncle S'Yan
 Jill Scott as Storm
 Stephen Stanton as Klaw

Additional voices
 Jonathan Adams as T'Chaka
 JB Blanc as Black Knight, Male Cannibal, Batroc the Leaper
 David Busch as Everett K. Ross
 Taye Diggs as Historical Black Panther #2
 Phil LaMarr as T'Shan
 Peter Lurie as Juggernaut
 Phil Morris as W'Kabi
 Vanessa Marshall as Dora Milaje, Female Cannibal
 Nolan North as Cyclops, Nightcrawler
 Adrian Pasdar as Captain America
 Kevin Michael Richardson as Wolverine, Historical Black Panther #1
 Rick D. Wasserman as Radioactive Man

Production
At a presentation held in New York City in April 2008, BET announced that it had signed a deal with Marvel Comics to turn Black Panther into a primetime half-hour animated series. In July 2008 at the San Diego Comic-Con International, the first footage of the series was shown publicly, indicating that the series was essentially just motion comic versions of the mini-series released by Marvel Comics.

The show was supervised by Reginald Hudlin (President of Entertainment at BET), Eric S. Rollman (President of Marvel Animation) and John Romita, Jr., writer and artist, respectively, of the story arc of the Black Panther comic entitled "Who is the Black Panther?", on which the first six episodes were based. Only subtle deviations from the comic exist, such as replacing Rhino with Juggernaut.

Djimon Hounsou was cast to voice T'Challa/Black Panther. The series was directed by Mark Brooks and Jon Schnepp.  Jon Schnepp co-directed and edited episodes 4 & 5 of the 6 episode animated motion comic series. The theme song was composed by Stephen James Taylor in a dialect meant to be Wakandan (the fictional character's native language). In reality, the song employed a Bantu-based language of Taylor's creation.

Episodes

Media releases

Australia
Magna Pacific released the series in region 4. It was released on DVD and Blu-ray on December 1, 2010.

United States
On January 18, 2011, the series was released to Region 1 DVD by Shout! Factory. It was part of the Marvel Knights Animation line, the line reserved for Marvel's motion comics.

Streaming
On March 16, 2018, the entire series was released through Marvel's YouTube channel for free as Marvel Knights Animation - Black Panther.

References

External links

 

Black Panther (Marvel Comics) in other media
2010s American adult animated television series
2010s American black cartoons
2010s American science fiction television series
2011 American television series debuts
2011 American television series endings
American action adventure television series
American adult animated action television series
American adult animated adventure television series
American adult animated superhero television series
American flash adult animated television series
English-language television shows
BET original programming
Marvel Animation
Adult animated television shows based on Marvel Comics